Chad Underkoffler is a game designer who has worked primarily on role-playing games.

Career
Chad Underkoffler had done some work for Atlas Games and Steve Jackson Games in the early 2000s. Underkoffler is known for his PDQ indie role-playing games published through his own Atomic Sock Monkey Press, including the horror fantasy game Dead Inside, the fairytale RPG, The Zorcerer of Zo, and Truth & Justice in the superhero genre. Evil Hat Productions brought Underkoffler on board to help with The Dresden Files Roleplaying Game in 2007. Leonard Balsera took on the role of Lead System Developer for Dresden Files while Underkoffler became the Lead Setting Developer, taking over the work that Genevieve Cogman had previously done. Underkoffler designed Swashbucklers of the 7 Skies (2009) for Evil Hat, which was a more traditional RPG than some of the other games the company had been releasing.

References

External links
 About
 

Indie role-playing game designers
Living people
Role-playing game designers
Year of birth missing (living people)